The Veterans' Compensation Cost-of-Living Adjustment Act of 2014 is a bill that would, beginning on December 1, 2014, increase the rates of veterans' disability compensation, additional compensation for dependents, the clothing allowance for certain disabled veterans, and dependency and indemnity compensation for surviving spouses and children. This is a cost of living increase.

The bill was introduced into the United States Senate during the 113th United States Congress.

Provisions of the bill
This summary is based largely on the summary provided by the Congressional Research Service, a public domain source.

The Veterans' Compensation Cost-of-Living Adjustment Act of 2014 would direct the Secretary of Veterans Affairs (VA) to increase, as of December 1, 2014, the rates of veterans' disability compensation, additional compensation for dependents, the clothing allowance for certain disabled veterans, and dependency and indemnity compensation for surviving spouses and children.

The bill would require each such increase to be the same percentage as the increase in benefits provided under title II (Old Age, Survivors and Disability Insurance) of the Social Security Act, on the same effective date.

Procedural history
The Veterans' Compensation Cost-of-Living Adjustment Act of 2014 was introduced into the United States Senate on April 28, 2014, by Sen. Mark Begich (D-AK). It was referred to the United States Senate Committee on Veterans' Affairs. On September 11, 2014, the Senate voted to pass the bill by unanimous consent.

Debate and discussion
Senator Begich, who introduced the bill, argued that "we have an obligation to the men and women who have sacrificed so much to serve our country and who now deserve nothing less than the full support of a grateful Nation."

See also
List of bills in the 113th United States Congress
Social Security (United States)

References

External links

Library of Congress - Thomas S. 2258
beta.congress.gov S. 2258
GovTrack.us S. 2258
OpenCongress.org S. 2258
WashingtonWatch.com S. 2258

Acts of the 113th United States Congress